The Globe Downtown Historic District encompasses a group of commercial, religious, and governmental buildings related to the status of Globe as the economic and governmental center of Gila County. Globe was designated as the County Seat of Gila County and grew into the primary economic and commercial center of the Globe mining region. The district also includes three prominent churches and the Globe Post Office and Courthouse, indicative of the area's being the core of civic life in the community. Primary growth of the community occurred between 1880 and 1935, which is considered the period of significance for the district.

References

National Register of Historic Places in Gila County, Arizona
Romanesque Revival architecture in Arizona
Art Deco architecture in Arizona
Buildings and structures in Globe, Arizona
Historic districts on the National Register of Historic Places in Arizona